Anti Terrorism Raju Memorial Sculpture ( Shontrash Birodhi Raju Sharokh Bhaskarjya) is a sculpture located in University of Dhaka campus of Bangladesh. It was created by Shaymol Chowdhury and considered one of the best sculptures in Bangladesh. It is dedicated to the memory of a student of Dhaka University named Moin Hossain Raju an activist of Bangladesh Students' Union who was killed while protesting against Terrorism. It was built in the late 1990s.

Gallery

References

University of Dhaka